Elizabeth E Meyer, was born in Baltimore in 1953. She was instrumental in the restoration of the J Class Yachts beginning with Endeavour in the mid 1980s. She is married to Michael McCaffrey.

Life
Her parents were medical doctors, a psychiatrist and an epidemiologist. Her grandfather was Eugene Meyer, investment banker and first president of the World Bank. He also owned The Washington Post publishing company. Her grandmother was Agnes Ernst Meyer, social activist and journalist. Elizabeth's aunt was Katharine Graham, owner of The Washington Post during Watergate. Meyer attended a Quaker Friends Academy and Bennington College in Vermont where she studied English. For a time she worked at sail making, also volunteering at a zoo and running a restaurant before starting a building restoration company in 1977. She published Yaahting, a parody of the magazine Yachting.  She also wrote for Nautical Quarterly.
Meyer has been politically active, opposing the Vietnam War and being involved in local politics in Newport, Rhode Island.

Yacht Restoration

In 1984 she purchased the J class yacht Endeavour and began the restoration. She was also instrumental in the restoration of Shamrock V another J, and more than 80 classic yachts. She is president of J-Class Management. She founded the International Yacht Restoration School in 1993 which has taught 400 students in yacht building and restoration.  For her efforts in building and yacht restoration she has received the president's award from the National Trust for Historic Preservation. In 2011 she received the Don Turner Award from the USS Constitution Museum for her work in maritime preservation. From 1975 to 1993 she owned the Concordia yawl, Matinicus and has authored books on the Ray Hunt designed class. She now sails Seminole, a 1916 Lawley-built 47 ft (14.3m) gaff yawl,  bought in 1996 from California unseen for a dollar. She completed its restoration in 2005 and has sailed Seminole with her husband over 18,000 miles.

References

External links
 Yachting Magazine Article
 Elizabeth Meyer - Queen of the J Class, Classic Boat Article
 J Class.com

1953 births
Yachting
Living people
Bennington College alumni
People from Baltimore
People from Newport, Rhode Island
Foxcroft School alumni